Noise Floor (Rarities: 1998–2005) is a compilation of previously recorded but unreleased or hard-to-find songs by Bright Eyes. The compilation album collects selected Bright Eyes singles, one-offs, unreleased tracks, collaborations and covers recorded between 1998 and 2005.

Background 
"Motion Sickness" was originally released as a standalone single in 2000.

Release
The compilation was released on CD and vinyl in Europe on October 9, 2006, and in the US on October 24, 2006 on Saddle Creek Records. The vinyl version of the album includes five extra tracks not found on the CD. Unlike the cover pictured, sometimes the artwork consists of a case completely decorated in flowers, there is no text on the case, and the cover pictured is sometimes included over the other cover. The inlay includes lyrics and a personal comment from Conor Oberst for most songs.

Critical reception

Noise Floor (Rarities: 1998–2005) received mostly positive reviews from contemporary music critics. At Metacritic, which assigns a normalized rating out of 100 to reviews from mainstream critics, the album received an average score of 67, based on 19 reviews, which indicates "generally favorable reviews".

Track listing

Charts

References

"Bright Eyes Rarities Compilation Due" by Kati Llewellyn, Pitchfork Media, July 20, 2006

External links
Saddle Creek Records

Bright Eyes (band) compilation albums
2006 compilation albums
Saddle Creek Records compilation albums